Oscar Lawrence Jackson (September 2, 1840 – February 16, 1920) was a Republican member of the U.S. House of Representatives from Pennsylvania and the commander of an Ohio infantry regiment in the Union Army during the American Civil War.

Biography
Oscar L. Jackson was born in Shenango Township, Lawrence County, Pennsylvania to Samuel Stewart and Nancy (Mitchell) Jackson.  He attended the common schools, Tansy Hill Select School, and Darlington Academy.  He later taught school in Hocking County, Ohio.

During the Civil War, Jackson served as an officer in the Union Army from 1861 to 1865.  He entered the service as the captain of Company H of the Sixty-third Regiment, Ohio Volunteer Infantry, and later received promotions of major, lieutenant colonel, and colonel by brevet after the war.  He was shot in the face by a Confederate soldier with a Squirrel Rifle and left for dead in the 2nd Battle of Corinth.

After the war, Jackson studied law, was admitted to the bar in 1867 and commenced practice in New Castle, Pennsylvania.  He served as district attorney from 1868 to 1871.  He was a member of the commission to codify laws and devise a plan for the government of cities of Pennsylvania in 1877 and 1878.
He published a book The fiery trail : a Union officer's account of Sherman's last campaigns

Jackson was elected as a Republican to the Forty-ninth and Fiftieth Congresses.  He was an unsuccessful candidate for renomination in 1888. He resumed the practice of law in New Castle and was a delegate to the 1896 Republican National Convention.

Oscar L. Jackson died in New Castle in 1920. Interment was in Greenwood Cemetery.

References
 Retrieved on 2008-02-14
The Political Graveyard

1840 births
1920 deaths
Union Army colonels
People of Ohio in the American Civil War
People of Pennsylvania in the American Civil War
Pennsylvania lawyers
People from Lawrence County, Pennsylvania
People from Hocking County, Ohio
Republican Party members of the United States House of Representatives from Pennsylvania
19th-century American lawyers